Abrahim Escudero Montoya (January 24, 1940 – November 6, 2009) was the Catholic bishop of the Diocese of Palmira, Colombia.

Ordained on June 8, 1968, by Monsignor Tulio Botero Salazar, Archbishop of Medellín. Escudero Montoya was named bishop on May 22, 1986, and he was ordained on June 21, 1986.

Notes

1940 births
2009 deaths
20th-century Roman Catholic bishops in Colombia
Roman Catholic bishops of Espinal
Roman Catholic bishops of Medellín